6 Persei is a binary star system in the northern constellation of Andromeda. It is faintly visible to the naked eye with an apparent visual magnitude of 5.29. It is moving further away with a heliocentric radial velocity of +42 km/s.

The inclination is estimated to be 104°.

It has 1.5 times the mass of the Sun and has expanded to 7 times the Sun's radius. The star is radiating 26 times the Sun's luminosity from its enlarged photosphere at an effective temperature of 4,920 K. It has a magnitude 10.49 visual companion at an angular separation of  along a position angle of 57°, as of 2004.

References

G-type giants
Spectroscopic binaries
Suspected variables
06 Perseus
Durchmusterung objects
Persei, 06
013530
010366
0645